Jung Woo (born Kim Jung-guk on January 14, 1981) is a South Korean actor.  He is best known for his roles in the drama Reply 1994 (2013) and You're the Best, Lee Soon-shin (2013).

Career
Jung Woo made his acting debut in 2006, and began his career appearing in minor roles on film and television. He drew attention in 2008 for his turn as a morally challenged but lovable villain in action film Spare, the directorial debut of Lee Seong-han.

In 2009, Lee directed Jung Woo again, this time in the leading role in Wish, a film which Jung Woo had written himself based on his own experiences as a troubled youth dreaming of becoming the number one fighter at his school. The character uses his real name Kim Jung-guk and nickname Jjianggu, the movie was shot at his childhood home and high school, Busan Commercial High School, and Jung Woo's real-life friends play themselves in the film. Spanning the years from Jjianggu's school life to his father's last days, the film was an official selection at the 2009 Busan International Film Festival. Jung Woo was praised for his performance, and won Best New Actor at the prestigious Grand Bell Awards in 2010.

In 2013, Jung Woo played a supporting role as a baker who falls for a divorced single mother in the family drama You're the Best, Lee Soon-shin. His mainstream popularity further increased when he was cast as one of the main characters of Reply 1994, a cable drama about a group of young students from different regions in Korea living together in a boarding house while going to college in 1990s Seoul. This was followed by a role in arthouse spy movie Red Family, produced by Kim Ki-duk.

Jung Woo next starred in the 2015 musical biopic C'est Si Bon. Set in the eponymous live music cafe in Mugyo-dong, downtown Seoul, the film depicted the formation of legendary folk music group Twin Folio, which was active from the 1960s to 80s.

In 2019, Jung was cast in the gangster movie The Boiling Blood.

Personal life
Jung Woo married actress Kim Yoo-mi on January 16, 2016. They became a couple after starring together in the 2013 film Red Family.

Filmography

Film

Television series

Web series

Television show

Music video

Awards and nominations

References

External links

 

South Korean male television actors
South Korean male film actors
Seoul Institute of the Arts alumni
FNC Entertainment artists
Kyung Hee University alumni
People from Busan
1981 births
Living people
21st-century South Korean male actors
Best New Actor Paeksang Arts Award (television) winners